The 2002 Swedish Rally (formally the 51st Uddeholm Swedish Rally) was the second round of the 2002 World Rally Championship. The race was held over three days between 1 February and 3 Febrouary 2002, and was won by Peugeot's Marcus Grönholm, his 8th win in the World Rally Championship.

Background

Entry list

Itinerary
All dates and times are CET (UTC+1).

Results

Overall

World Rally Cars

Classification

Special stages

Championship standings

Production World Rally Championship

Classification

Special stages

Championship standings

References

External links 
 Official website of the World Rally Championship

Sweden
Swedish Rally
Rally